Eulophia obtusa, a showy and distinctive species of orchid, popularly known as the ground orchid, recorded from Bangladesh, North India and Nepal (Sourav, M.S.H, et al. 2017). This orchid  growing in seasonally in grassland. It is a grass associated orchid species. A Bangladesh based renowned botanist and ornithologist Md Sharif Hossain Sourav first described this rare species from Bangladesh in 2017 (Sourav, M.S.H, et al. 2017). There are only three collections in the Kew Herbarium dates from 1902, which suggests that it is quite a rare species. It is assessed as critically endangered (CR) in Bangladesh according to the IUCN Red Listing criteria. Very recently this species was rediscovered in India after 118 years.

Description

Terrestrial, seasonally deciduous herb, bearing underground corms. Corm white, dome-shaped, 2.5 – 3.1 cm wide and 3.3 – 5.5 cm high, lying 10 – 20 cm below ground, bearing vermiform, white roots. Shoots 1 – 5-leaved, usually bifoliate, the basal part formed by sheaths enveloping the base of the inflorescence as well as the leaf-bases. Leaves appearing with the inflorescence, grass-like, 35 – 50 cm long, 0.15 – 0.5 cm wide, linear, slightly plicate, apex acuminate, midrib prominent, sheathing at base.  Column 8 mm long, with a short foot.

The only known site of Eulophia obtusa in Bangladesh is situated in the high Barind tract, one of the major agro-ecological regions comprising about 79% of Godagari upazila. The vegetation is composed of grasses like Imperata cylindrica and Saccharum spontaneum as well as herbs and shrubs, including Amorphophallus margaritifer, Amorphophallus paeoniifolius, Boerhavia diffusa, Chrozophora rottleri, Colocasia esculenta, Commelina benghalensis, Croton bonplandianus, Cyanotis cristata, Cyperus sp., Digera muricata, Euphorbia hirta, Ficus hispida, Kyllinga microcephala, Leucas lavandulifolia, Lippia alba, Parthenium hysterophorus, Phyllanthus virgatus, Solanum villosum, Uraria picta, and others. In North India, Eulophia obtusa has been found in freshwater swamps (Deva & Naithani 1986). The elevations have not been recorded for the collections we have seen, but they are probably all from below 200 m above sea level.

Flowering: June – July; fruiting: not seen, but local informants stated that they had seen the plants in fruit.

References

External links
The Story Of A Rare Orchid That Reappeared In India After 118 Years

obtusa
Flora of the Indian subcontinent
Taxa named by John Lindley
Plants described in 1833